Harrowden is a one-street hamlet in the civil parish of Eastcotts, in Bedfordshire.

Harrowden has only 18 houses and 32 people on the electoral roll. Elstow Brook runs through it.  There is just one road - Old Harrowden Lane - which leads to a footpath known as Bumpy Lane, from where you can access the birthplace of John Bunyan, now simply marked by a stone.

The street runs from east to west parallel and to the south of the A421 Bedford Southern Bypass, and 200 metres to the north of the village of Shortstown. There is a path at the west side of Harrowden named Bumpy Lane that leads to Abbey Fields. Like Shortstown, Harrowden is in the Eastcotts parish, of the Borough of Bedford.

History 
Harrowden is mentioned in the Domesday Survey of 1086, though by the 13th century the area became known as Eastcotes or Cotes. The name derives from the Old English name for a cottage - 'cotum'.

Other
John Bunyan, the noted Christian writer, was born in Harrowden. (See also Slough of Despond).
The name of the hamlet comes from the Old English Hearg-dūn, meaning "Temple Hill".

References

External links

Hamlets in Bedfordshire
Borough of Bedford